Glenn Walker might refer to:

Glenn Walker (footballer, born 1967), English footballer
Glenn Walker (footballer, born 1998), Norwegian footballer
Glenn D. Walker (1916–2002), American soldier
Glen Walker (born 1952), American football player